Vorden is a railway station in Vorden, Netherlands. The station opened on 24 June 1878 and is located on the Zutphen–Winterswijk railway. The train services are operated by Arriva.

Train services

Bus services

External links
NS website 
Dutch Public Transport journey planner 

Railway stations in Gelderland
Railway stations opened in 1878
Bronckhorst